Rodrigo Iñaki Melo (born 24 September 1995) is an Argentine professional footballer who plays as a midfielder for Deportivo Cuenca.

Career
Melo started with Comunicaciones in Primera B Metropolitana. In his opening two campaigns, 2015 and 2016, Melo featured five times in each, three of which on both occasions being starts; though he played for eighteen more minutes in 2016. Having made seventy-one appearances in the following two seasons, Melo left the club in June 2018 to join Primera B Nacional side Ferro Carril Oeste on loan. He made his debut on 25 August during a defeat away to Nueva Chicago.

Career statistics
.

References

External links

1995 births
Living people
Argentine footballers
Argentine expatriate footballers
Place of birth missing (living people)
Association football midfielders
Primera B Metropolitana players
Primera Nacional players
Ecuadorian Serie A players
Club Comunicaciones footballers
Ferro Carril Oeste footballers
Estudiantes de Buenos Aires footballers
C.D. Cuenca footballers
Argentine expatriate sportspeople in Ecuador
Expatriate footballers in Ecuador